Jan Šulc (born 29 May 1998) is a professional Czech football left or right midfielder currently playing for FC Slovan Liberec in the Czech First League.

He made his senior league debut for Liberec on 1 May 2017 in a Czech First League 4–1 home win against Bohemians 1905.

References

External links 
 
 
 Jan Šulc profile on the FC Slovan Liberec official website

Czech footballers
1998 births
Living people
Czech First League players
Czech National Football League players
FC Slovan Liberec players
FK Varnsdorf players
1. SC Znojmo players
Association football midfielders